Suspiria is a 1977 Italian horror film.

Suspiria may also refer to:

Suspiria (1977 soundtrack), the soundtrack to the 1977 film
Suspiria (2018 film), a remake of the 1977 film
Suspiria (Thom Yorke soundtrack album), soundtrack to the 2018 film
Suspiria (Miranda Sex Garden album), 1993
Suspiria (Darkwell album), 2000
"Suspiria" (2010 song), a rock song by Rey Pila off their eponymous debut album Rey Pila (album)
"Suspiria" (2000 song), a song from the eponymous album Suspiria (Darkwell album)
"Suspiria" (1988 song), a flute tune by composer Jesús Rueda (composer)
"Suspiria" (1977 song), a song from the eponymous soundtrack album Suspiria (soundtrack)
Suspiria (band), an English Gothic band from Bristol
Suspiria de Profundis, an 1845 prose poem by English essayist Thomas De Quincey
Suspiria, a character in Star Trek: Voyager; the female Caretaker, who appears in the episode Cold Fire

See also
Susperia, a Norwegian blackened thrash metal band